"Bullet" is the tenth single by the English electronic music band Fluke. Eventually released on the album, Oto the track was the first of two singles released by Fluke in 1995.

In addition to the versions listed on this page a VHS promotional video release was created.

Versions

Fluke (band) songs
1995 singles
1995 songs